The MP-661K "Drozd" is  Russian-made BB pistol and rifle.

Options
The MP661K is best known for being one of the few (if only) select-fire BB guns and can fire single, three-round, and six-round bursts - although in some markets, such as the United Kingdom, only semi-auto is available. 

It is popular with both casual target shooters and airgun enthusiasts; it is excellent out of the box plus offers customization options and upgrades. Such modifications include aftermarket/third-party and user-community alterations and upgrades such as "mod boards" that can increase the rate of fire up to 2000 rounds per minute and provide true fully automatic operation, adapters to use external propellant sources (such as 20 oz paintball CO2 tanks or HPA scuba tanks), dye kits to change the color (commonly RIT fabric dye is used), and longer barrels (higher velocity).

Construction
The quality of the gun is high, with the main functional components being made from firearms quality steel and the plastic parts (trigger, main receiver housings, buttstock, lower magazine cover) being made from firearms quality fiber reinforced polymers. The gun is manufactured by a company that also manufactures and designs military firearms (best known for their WWII production of the Tokarev TT-33 and M1895 Nagant revolver), and many of the parts are thus "over engineered" with military-style durability. The price of the Drozd is much higher than typical "department store" airguns, partly due to the use of the higher quality components and increased durability.

The barrel is rifled steel and extremely thick and rugged for an airgun. Although such components do not translate into increased accuracy, they do tend to increase durability. The rifling does not significantly increase the gun's accuracy; spherical projectiles comprising non-malleable materials demonstrate little, if any, accuracy differences between rifled and smoothbore barrels.

The Blackbird
The Baikal factory have now also released "The Blackbird" a version of the Drozd equipped with a bulk feed and a 400-round magazine, which remedies the achilles heel of the original Bumblebee: the tiny 30-round magazine capacity (which can be emptied in one and a half seconds on a 1,200 rpm modified gun).

The Blackbird boasts a 400-round-plus capacity, as well as an improved three-cartridge 12-gram CO2 system, or a single 88-gram large CO2 cartridge. It shares many parts with the original Drozd and retains the same basic body configuration, as well as the original Drozd's stock firing modes.

Some have criticized the new Backbird for having an overall cheaper "plastic" appearance, but the large magazine capacity makes it completely different kind of gun than the original Drozd. Full auto (600/900/1200rpm) modification chips especially designed for the Blackbird are now readily available, and despite the stated 400-round capacity, in actuality, the magazine easily hold many more BBs than that. When combined with a remote tank like those commonly used in paintball (either CO2 or HPA), the Blackbird can deliver nearly a thousand rounds of operation use.

References

External links
Drozd BB Rifle Enthusiast Site
Makarov.com writeup
Drozd BB Rifle US Distributors Site
Manufacturers Site
Drozd BB Gun
Drozd BB Gun
Drozd BB Gun

Air guns of Russia
Izhevsk Mechanical Plant products